The Kitkatla or Gitxaala are one of the 14 bands of the Tsimshian nation of the Canadian province of British Columbia, and inhabit a village, also called Kitkatla (sometimes called Laxklan), on Dolphin Island, a small island just by Porcher Island off the coast of northern B.C. Because of their location, the Kitkatla have sometimes been called Porcher Island Indians. They were also, in the early contact period, called the Sebassa tribe, for their paramount chief at the time, Ts'ibasaa. The name Kitkatla derives from the Tsimshian name Gitkxaała, from git- (people of) and kxaała (open sea), since they are the farthest from the mainland of the Tsimshian tribes. Another name for themselves is Git lax m'oon ("people of the saltwater") in recognition of the land they lived on: the islands and inlets of this rugged piece of coastline.

The Kitkatla are reputed to be the first Tsimshians to encounter (formally anyway) Europeans and the first to use guns.  Stories recording this encounter tell of the acquisition of the hereditary name He'l by the Gispwudwada (Blackfish or Killerwhale clan) House (extended matrilineal family) of Ts'ibasaa, from an English ship's captain named Hale.

In the more recent period, one holder of the name He'l also assumed rights over the Gispwudwada chief name Seeks, which represents another Kitkatla house-group.

One holder of the title Ts'ibasaa was Joshua Ts'ibasaa, who died in 1936.  The anthropologist Viola Garfield has published a detailed description of his mortuary potlatch.

Garfield also describes the House of Ts'ibasaa's genealogical merging with another Gispwudwada (Blackfish or Killerwhale clan) house-group, the royal house of the Ginadoiks tribe of Tsimshians at Lax Kw'alaams (Port Simpson), B.C.

A large amount of information on the hereditary names, territories, and oral traditions of the Kitkatla people was collected in 1916 by William Beynon, a Tsimshian chief and translator in the employ of the ethnologist Marius Barbeau.

Today Kitkatla is a large and thriving community.  Its population in 1983 was 493.  It has temporarily suspended treaty negotiations with the British Columbia government.

Other Kitkatla house-groups include:

House of Dzagmgishaaytks – Ganhada (Raven clan)
House of La'ooy – Ganhada (Raven clan)
House of Ligidiił – Ganhada (Raven clan)
House of Niismuulx – Gispwudwada (Blackfish or Killerwhale clan)
House of Ts'ibasaa – Gispwudwada (Blackfish or Killerwhale clan)

Prominent people of Kitkatla ancestry

 Edward Gamble, hereditary chief (Ts'ibasaa, He'l, Seeks)
 Russell Gamble, hereditary chief and basketball administrator (He'l)
 Charles Menzies

References

Sources

 Barbeau, Marius (1950) Totem Poles.  2 vols.  (Anthropology Series 30, National Museum of Canada Bulletin 119.)  Ottawa: National Museum of Canada.
 Beynon, William (1987)  "The Origin of the Name Hale."  In: Tsimshian Narratives 2: Trade and Warfare, ed. by George F. MacDonald and John J. Cove, pp. 158–159.  Ottawa: Canadian Museum of Civilization.
 Brown, Dorothy (1992)  Saaban: The Tsimshian and Europeans Meet.  (Suwilaay'msga Na Ga'niiyatgm, Teachings of Our Grandfathers, vol. 3.)  Prince Rupert, B.C.: First Nations Advisory Council of School District No. 52.
 Garfield, Viola E. (1939) "Tsimshian Clan and Society."  University of Washington Publications in Anthropology, vol. 7, no. 3, pp. 167–340.
 Inglis, Gordon B., et al. (1990) "Tsimshians of British Columbia since 1900."  In Handbook of North American Indians, Volume 7: Northwest Coast, pp. 285–293.  Washington: Smithsonian Institution.
 Miller, Jay (1997)  Tsimshian Culture: A Light through the Ages.  Lincoln: University of Nebraska Press.
 Nowry, Laurence (1995)  Marius Barbeau, Man of Mana: A Biography.  Toronto: NC Press (pp. 165–168).

Further reading
  online at Google Books

Tsimshian
North Coast of British Columbia